The Bartel's flying squirrel (Hylopetes bartelsi) is a rodent species in the family Sciuridae endemic to West Java, Indonesia. It inhabits subtropical and tropical forest.

Name 
The Bartel's flying squirrel was named after Dutch naturalist Max Eduard Gottlieb Bartels.

References

Hylopetes
Mammals of Indonesia
Mammals described in 1939
Taxa named by Frederick Nutter Chasen
Taxonomy articles created by Polbot